Pär Edlund (born 9 April 1967) is a Swedish former professional ice hockey player. He scored five goals and six assists at the 1987 World Junior Ice Hockey Championships. He is currently a member of the coaching staff for Frölunda HC in Elitserien.

References

External links

1967 births
Frölunda HC players
IF Björklöven players
Living people
Los Angeles Kings draft picks
Swedish ice hockey forwards